The Backseat Lovers is an American alternative rock band that formed in Provo, Utah in 2018. The band's 2019 single, "Kilby Girl", has accumulated over 300 million streams on Spotify and reached number 39 on the Billboard Rock & Alternative Airplay chart. The band released their major label debut album, Waiting to Spill, on October 28, 2022 via Capitol Records.

History
 
The Backseat Lovers was formed in 2018. Lead singer and drummer Joshua Harmon and guitarist Jonas Swanson first met while waiting in line for an open mic in Provo, Utah in 2017. The two were joined by drummer Juice Welch and bassist Ethan Christensen. Christensen was later replaced by KJ Ward. In June 2018, the group won a "battle of the bands" competition at Velour, a Provo venue. That month, the band also self-released its first EP, Elevator Days.
 
In January 2019, The Backseat Lovers released its first studio album, When We Were Friends. The album featured the singles, "Maple Syrup" and "Kilby Girl". The latter song went on to accumulate over 100 million streams on Spotify by 2022. It also received radio airplay on stations like KKDO in Sacramento and the Sirius XM radio channel, Alt Nation. It peaked at number 39 on the Billboard Rock & Alternative Airplay chart in 2021. The band toured throughout 2019 in support of When We Were Friends.
 
The band also toured throughout 2021, including its first festival date at Lollapalooza in July of that year. In 2022, the band embarked on its North American "Turning Point" tour. Later in 2022, the group began releasing new singles, including "Growing/Dying", "Close Your Eyes", and "Slowing Down". Those songs appeared on the band's major label debut studio album, Waiting to Spill, which was released on October 28, 2022 via Capitol Records. The Backseat Lovers also announced its first tour in the U.K. and Ireland due to take place in the spring of 2023.

Discography

Studio albums

EPs

Singles

References

External links
Official website

American alternative rock groups